The Northern Ireland Masters was a professional golf tournament that was played at Clandeboye Golf Club in Newtownards, Northern Ireland. It was originally played as a one-off event on the Challenge Tour in September 2003. Darren Clarke won the inaugural event by two shots ahead of Stuart Little.

The event returned in 2021 as part of the PGA EuroPro Tour's schedule. It was hosted by recent first-time European Tour winner Jonathan Caldwell. The tournament was played again in 2022 on the PGA EuroPro Tour.

Winners

Notes

References

External links
Coverage on the Challenge Tour's official site (2003)

Former Challenge Tour events
Golf tournaments in Northern Ireland